Lakshmi Narasimha is an iconographical depiction of Narasimha, the fourth avatar of Vishnu, with his consort Lakshmi, the goddess of prosperity. It is one of the five iconographical forms of Narasimha, among Jvala Narasimha, Gandaberunda Narasimha, Ugra Narasimha, and Yoga Narasimha.

Legend 

In an alternate iteration of the legend of Narasimha, after he slays Hiranyakashipu, his fury is still unabated. The deity is enraged that his virtuous devotee, Prahlada, is traumatised by the violent deeds of his own father. Despite the fact that the devas sing his praises and extol his glories, he remains unpacified. The devas proceed to pray to Lakshmi, who appears before her consort. She soothes Narasimha, assuring him that both his devotee and the world had been saved. Hearing his wife's words, the deity is pacified, and his appearance also becomes more benign. As a result, Lakshmi Narasimha is venerated as a representation of gentleness and peace.

Iconography 
Narasimha is depicted with his consort Lakshmi, seated on his lap.  In contrast to his ugra (terrible) aspect, where his face is contorted and enraged, he appears to be serene in this form. He often carries his aspects of the Sudarshana Chakra and Panchajanya, and his murti is decorated with ornaments and garlands.

Symbolism 
In the Thiruppavai, the mythical motif of the lion is invoked in the representation of Lakshmi Narasimha. The deity is regarded to be magnanimous, the greatest of all beings (Purushottama), and his heart is symbolised by his consort, Lakshmi.

Temples 

 Lakshmi Narasimha temple, Antarvedi
 Lakshmi Narasimha temple, Dharmapuri
 Lakshmi Narasimha temple, Yadadri
 Lakshmi Narasimha temple, Mangalagiri
 Lakshminarasimha temple, Javagal
 Lakshmi Narasimha temple, Bhadravati
 Lakshminarasimha temple, Haranhalli
 Lakshminarasimha temple, Vignasante
 Lakshmi Narasimhar temple, Narasinghapuram
 Lakshminarasimha temple, Nuggehalli

Gallery

See also 

 Lakshmi Narayana
 Vaikuntha Kamalaja
 Radha Krishna

References 

Forms of Vishnu
Lakshmi
Vaishnavism